In enzymology, a galactolipid galactosyltransferase is an enzyme that catalyzes the chemical reaction

2 3-(beta-D-galactosyl)-1,2-diacyl-sn-glycerol  3-[alpha-D-galactosyl-(1->6)-beta-D-galactosyl]-1,2-diacyl-sn- glycerol + 1,2-diacyl-sn-glycerol

Hence, this enzyme has one substrate, 3-(beta-D-galactosyl)-1,2-diacyl-sn-glycerol, but 3 products: [[3-[alpha-D-galactosyl-(1->6)-beta-D-galactosyl]-1,2-diacyl-sn-]], glycerol, and 1,2-diacyl-sn-glycerol.

This enzyme belongs to the family of glycosyltransferases, specifically the hexosyltransferases.  The systematic name of this enzyme class is 3-(beta-D-galactosyl)-1,2-diacyl-sn-glycerol:mono-3-(beta-D-galactos yl)-1,2-diacyl-sn-glycerol beta-D-galactosyltransferase. Other names in common use include galactolipid-galactolipid galactosyltransferase, galactolipid:galactolipid galactosyltransferase, interlipid galactosyltransferase, GGGT, DGDG synthase (ambiguous), and digalactosyldiacylglycerol synthase (ambiguous).  This enzyme participates in glycerolipid metabolism.

References

 
 
 
 
 

EC 2.4.1
Enzymes of unknown structure